Aicha Bilal Fall (born 31 December 1993) is a Mauritanian middle-distance runner who competed at the 2012 Summer Olympics in the women's 800 m event. She was born in Nouakchott, Mauritania.

References 

1993 births
Living people
People from Nouakchott
Olympic athletes of Mauritania
Athletes (track and field) at the 2012 Summer Olympics
Athletes (track and field) at the 2010 Summer Youth Olympics
Mauritanian female middle-distance runners
World Athletics Championships athletes for Mauritania